Teruo Gotō (後藤輝夫, Gotō Teruo; born February 19, 1953, in Sakata, Yamagata, Japan) is a Japanese saxophonist and percussionist.

Biography 
After he graduated from Sakata Chuo High School, he attended an art university to study photography, but spent more time playing saxophone in a jazz group. In 1979, he joined Junko Ohashi and Minoya Central Station releasing the album Full House that same year and Hot Life a year later. During the production of Full House, Gotō met drummer Marty Bracey as they were both participants of the backing band.

In 1987, he joined the band 1986 Omega Tribe as a backing member along with Bracey, keyboardist Tetsuya Osaka and bassist Shigeru Watanabe. The members also participated in the band's tours, with Watanabe being replaced the same year by Wornell Jones. Gotō and the others stayed as members until the band's disbandment in 1991. That same year, he participated in the production of The Moritaka as a performer.

In 2004, he participated in S. Kiyotaka & Omega Tribe's 2004 reunion concert First Finale 2. Since then, he was performed with the band's singer Kiyotaka Sugiyama multiple times as well as Hirokuni Korekata of Korenos. In 2007, he released the album '"Beat From The Earth with Yūji Imamura.

In 2014, Gotō released the album But Beautiful with guitarist Jun Satsuma. Songs from the album were used in the movie Yukiguni.'' In 2015, he formed the band B-EDGE alongside Bracey, Jones, Tomoharu Hani and Nishiyama "Hank" Fumio. In 2019, he formed a jazz unit called Fool's Paradise.

Discography

Studio albums

References 

Living people
1953 births
Japanese saxophonists
Japanese percussionists
20th-century Japanese musicians
People from Yamagata Prefecture
Japanese flautists
20th-century flautists